Ponytail Canasta is a variation of the card game Canasta. The rules for Canasta were standardized in North America around the 1950s and it was this version of the game that gained worldwide popularity. In many countries, classic Canasta is still played in more or less its original form, sometimes alongside a number of variations.

In North America, some players have continued to develop the game. There are several variations of Ponytail Canasta, but no official version has ever been sanctioned. This is not Hand and Foot Canasta, but there are some similarities between the two games.

Canasta is generally agreed to be best for four players playing in partnerships. However, there are playable versions for two, three, or four partnerships. These additional player partnerships call for additional decks of cards

Cards

Canasta is normally played with standard 52 card decks plus two jokers.

The cards A, K, Q, J, 10, 9, 8, 7, 6, 5, 4 are called natural cards. All of the deuces (twos) and jokers are wild cards. With some restrictions, wild cards can be used during the game as substitutes for a natural card of any rank.

The threes have special functions and values: Black threes are used as discards as they cannot be picked up. Black three's (3♠ / 3♣) held in a player's hand at the end of the game count minus 100 points (subtracted from the player's score). Red threes (3 ♥ / 3 ♦) are not to be used to meld a Canasta, but are set into the meld area and have a value of 100 points each.  Black three's may only be melded by the player going out at the end of the hand with three or more threes.

Game play

Player and decks

Basic Ponytail Canasta may be played with four or six players and six decks of cards.  Each additional player adds one deck of cards.

Dealing

A dealer is determined in some fashion.  All decks are shuffled into a single large deck. The player to the right of the dealer cuts the decks after the shuffle.  The dealer then takes a group of cards from the top of the deck and deals 15 cards, in a clockwise manner, for each player. He passes each player the hand for that player. If the player cutting the cards cuts the exact number of cards for 4 players + one card for the discard pile, that pair gets a 100 pt. bonus. The player to the left of the dealer takes a stack of cards from the large deck and deals out 13 cards for each player also clockwise.

He places these 13 card Pony Hands in front of each player. The remaining cards from each dealer's pile are returned to the deck. The top 40-50 cards from the deck are placed in the card distribution caddy in the center of the table. The remaining cards are set aside, to be used to replenish the distribution stack as it gets low.

The top card from the distribution stack is turned over and placed in the discard tray. If this first face-up card is wild or a seven, another card is turned and placed on top of it, continuing until a card which is not a wild card or seven is turned up; the wild card or seven should be stacked at right angles to the rest of the pile, to indicate that the discard pile is frozen (see Frozen Discard Pile below).  The next and consecutive games, the dealer and ponytail dealer tasks shift one person to the left. This shift continues until the game ends.

Play

The player to the left of the dealer plays first, and then the turn to play passes clockwise. A basic turn consists of drawing two cards from the top of the distribution stack, adding them to their hand without showing it to the other players. After drawing, but before discarding, players may sometimes be able to play some cards from their hand face up on the table. To play cards to the table in this way is known as melding, and the sets of three cards or more, so played, are melds. These melded cards remain face up on the table until the end of the play. Melding to make Canastas is the object of the game, making as many Canastas as possible. Discarding one card from a players hand face up on top of the discard pile completes each player's turn.  When your hand or pony has a red three in it, on your turn place the red three aside where your canastas are and draw one card to replace it in your hand.  These red threes count as 100 points at end of hand. After a Canasta is made by a partner, both partners may pick up their pile of 13 hands immediately.

Discard pile

Under certain conditions, instead of drawing from the distribution stack, players are permitted to take the whole discard pile. In order to do this, players must be able to meld the top discard. The top card and only the top card with at least two cards from their hand, must be used to make the meld. Or, if a player already has a meld of cards of the same type as the discard, except wild cards, they may pick up the discard pile and use the top card.   Afterward, the meld any of the other cards from the discard pile may be used in current melds or to make new melds. Players can pick up the discard pile if they have a natural card of the same value as the top card and one wild card (unless the discard pile is frozen), melding the top card with the natural card and wild card from their hand.

The procedure in this case is :
 Placing the necessary cards from a player's hand face up on the table, and adding the top card of the discard pile to them to form a valid meld or melds. 
 Taking all the remaining cards of the discard pile and adding them a player's hand. 
 If a player wishes, they make further melds from the cards they now have in their hand.

Frozen discard pile

There are three ways that the discard pile can be frozen :
 The discard pile is frozen against all players if it contains a wild card. To show that it is frozen, the wild card is placed at right angles in the pile, so that it is still visible after other cards are discarded on top of it. 
 In the unusual case where a red three is turned up to start the discard pile after the deal, the discard pile is frozen against all players, and the red three is placed at a right angle to show this. 
 If a player has not yet melded, the discard pile is frozen.

When the discard pile is frozen, a player can only take it if they hold in their hand two natural cards of the same rank as the top card of the discard pile, and use these with the top discard to make a meld. This meld can either be a new one, or could be the same rank as an existing meld, in which case the melds are then merged. For example, if the pile were frozen and the player already has a meld of four Jacks on the table. If the previous player discards a Jack, the next player cannot pick up the discard pile unless they have two Jacks concealed in their hand. If they do have two Jacks in their hand, they can add them and the discarded Jack to their meld (making a Canasta), and take the rest of the discard pile.

Melds

The object of the game is to score points by melding cards. A valid meld consists of three or more cards of the same rank (any rank from four up to ace), such as three kings, six fives, etc. Melds belong to the team partnership, not to an individual player. They are kept face up in front of one of the partners. Typically, a partnership will have several melds, each of a different rank. A player can add further cards of the appropriate rank to any of their side's melds, whether begun by them or by their partner, however they can never add cards to an opponent's meld.

Wild cards (jokers and twos) can normally be used in melds as substitutes for cards of the appropriate rank. For example, Q-Q-Q-2 or 8-8-8-8-2-joker would be valid (dirty) melds. There must always be more natural cards than wild cards in the meld at any time with a maximum of three wild cards in any one meld. For example, a meld of 6-6-2-2 would not be allowed. Threes cannot be melded at any time.

For each partnership, during a hand when they put down one or more melds, is called their initial meld. When making the initial meld for their partnership, players must meet a certain minimum count requirement, in terms of the total value of cards that they put down. Players are allowed to count several separate melds laid down at the same time in order to meet this requirement. The initial meld must be made entirely from their hand after they draw, or from their hand plus the top card of the discard pile to satisfy the minimum count, before picking up the remainder of the pile. Before players have made their initial meld, the discard pile is frozen to them, they must have two naturals of the same value in their hand to pick it up.

The initial meld requirement applies to a partnership, not to an individual player. Therefore, after either a player or their partner have made a meld that meets the requirement, both of them can meld freely or add cards to an existing meld for the rest of that hand.

Each team must make its own initial meld, meeting the required point value for that team. That is to say each team can have a different minimum point value for their initial meld, based on the teams accumulated score from previous hands. If a players partnership has not yet melded, then in order to meld, the total value of the cards they lay down must meet a minimum count requirement. This requirement depends on their partnership's cumulative score from previous hands.

Player cumulative score

To achieve the count, players create several melds at once; the melds can be of more than the minimum size of three cards. The standard values of the cards played are added together to reach the requirement. It is the card value that counts (if a player were to lay down seven 4's making a Canasta, the point value toward the minimum requirement would only be 35 (seven times 5 points) not 500 points for the Canasta). Once the minimum point value is reached, then the Canasta is made and counts 500 points at the end of the hand.

Canastas

A Canasta is a meld of seven cards. If all of the cards in it are natural, it is called a natural or red Canasta; the cards are squared up and a red card is placed on top. The Canastas are all grouped together in front of the player. If the Canasta includes one or more wild cards it is called a dirty or black Canasta; it is squared up with a natural black card on top.

In Ponytail Canasta, melds of more than seven cards are not allowed. Players cannot add cards to a previously formed Canasta, as in some other variations of Canasta. After players have made melds and successfully created their first Canasta, they may pick up their 13-card ponytail that has been sitting in front of them since the original deal. They can continue their play by melding or adding to existing melds with cards from the Ponytail. Cards from the ponytail not melded are added to their hand and a discard completes the turn.

End game

The game ends is the phase when a player loses, "goes out". To go out, and be awarded the 200-point bonus, a player disposes of all the cards in his or her hand. A player can only go out after they have fulfilled the minimum required conditions as described below. A player can go out by melding all but one of the cards in their hand and discarding the last card or by melding the entire hand, leaving no discard. The game can also end if the distribution deck runs out of cards.

Minimum requirements to go out

A team must have all of the following Canastas:

A Natural (red) Canasta
A Dirty (black) Canasta
A Natural (red) Canasta of sevens (7)
A Canasta of wild cards

Scoring

When the play has ended the hand is scored. Each player's score for the hand consists of:

The total value of any bonuses they are entitled to (see table) 
Plus (+) the total value of all the cards they have melded 
Minus (-) the total value of any cards remaining in their hands

After the bonuses have been calculated, the cards used in the Canastas and the melds for each player are counted using the standard card values. The cards remaining in the hands of the players are also counted using the same standard values, but these points count against the player and are subtracted from their score. A cumulative total score is kept for each player. It is possible to have a negative score. The game ends when a player has a total of 50,000 or more points at the end of a hand or 4 hands have been played, and the player with the higher total score wins. The margin of victory is the difference between the scores of the players.

American card games
Canasta